Stony Brook University School of Dental Medicine is a school of dentistry located in Stony Brook, New York on Long Island. It is one of 12 colleges within Stony Brook University and was founded in 1968.

The school is one of the five dental schools in the state of New York and is one of only two public dental schools in the state of New York along with the State University of New York at Buffalo School of Dental Medicine.

History 
The Stony Brook University School of Dental Medicine was founded at Stony Brook University in 1968. The founding Dean was Dr. J. Howard Oaks, who previously served as acting Dean of the Harvard School of Dental Medicine. Its first class of students was welcomed in 1973.

Academics 
The Stony Brook University School of Dental Medicine awards following degrees:

 Doctor of Dental Surgery
 Master of Science in Oral Biology and Pathology

Departments 
The Stony Brook University School of Dental Medicine includes the following departments:

 Department of Dental Medicine
 Department of General Dentistry
 Department of Hospital Dentistry and Dental Anesthesiology
 Department of Oral and Maxillofacial Surgery
 Department of Oral Biology and Pathology
 Department of Orthodontics and Pediatric Dentistry
 Department of Periodontics and Endodontics

Accreditation 
The Stony Brook University School of Dental Medicine is currently accredited by American Dental Association.

Notable Alumni 
 Ira Lamster, DDS '77, past dean, Columbia University College of Dental Medicine
 Maria Emanuel Ryan, DDS '89, PhD '98, vice president and chief clinical officer, Colgate-Palmolive

See also

 American Student Dental Association

References 

Dental schools in New York (state)
Dental Medicine
1968 establishments in New York (state)
Educational institutions established in 1968